Floribert Tambwe Ndayisaba (born 12 August 1989) is a Burundian footballer, who currently plays for Bidco United.

Career
Ndayisaba began his career with Chanic FC before signing for Vital'O F.C. in  2005. In the summer of 2008 Ndayisaba signed for FK Baku in Azerbaijan, and was part of the squad that won the 2008–09 Azerbaijan Premier League, although he didn't make a league appearance for Baku.  

Ndayisaba was signed in June 2012 by A.F.C. Leopards for Sh1.8 million from Rayon Sports on an 18-month contract,  before going to Oman with Allan Wanga for a trial with Al-Nasr in January 2013. Having not secured a deal in Oman, Ndayisaba left Leopards in the summer with six-months remaining on his contract, moving to Democratic Republic of Congo Division One side Shark 11.

Ndayisaba signed with Bidco United for the 2014 Kenyan National Super League season.

International career
He is currently member of the Burundi national football team.

Notes

1989 births
Living people
Burundian footballers
Burundi international footballers
Association football defenders
Expatriate footballers in Azerbaijan
Vital'O F.C. players